Heliocheilus is a genus of moths of the family Noctuidae. Former synonyms include Canthylidia (Butler, 1886).

Species

 Heliocheilus abaccheutus Matthews, 1999
 Heliocheilus aberrans (Butler, 1886)
 Heliocheilus albipunctella (de Joannis, 1925)
 Heliocheilus albivenata (Montague, 1914)
 Heliocheilus aleurota (Lower, 1902)
 Heliocheilus atrilinea (Turner, 1943)
 Heliocheilus biocularis (Gaede, 1915)
 Heliocheilus canusina (Swinhoe, 1901)
 Heliocheilus cistella (Swinhoe, 1901)
 Heliocheilus cladotus Swinhoe, 1901
 Heliocheilus confertissima (Walker, 1865)
 Heliocheilus cramboides (Guenée, 1852)
 Heliocheilus eodora (Meyrick, 1902)
 Heliocheilus ferruginosa (Turner, 1911)
 Heliocheilus fervens Butler 1881
 Heliocheilus flavitincta (Lower, 1908)
 Heliocheilus fumata (Lucas, 1890)
 Heliocheilus halimolimnus Matthews, 1999
 Heliocheilus ionola (Swinhoe, 1901)
 Heliocheilus julia (Grote, 1883)
 Heliocheilus lupatus (Grote, 1875)
 Heliocheilus melibaphes (Hampson, 1903)
 Heliocheilus mesoleuca (Lower, 1902)
 Heliocheilus moribunda (Guenée, 1852)
 Heliocheilus multiradiata (Hampson, 1902)
 Heliocheilus neurota (Lower, 1903)
 Heliocheilus pallida (Butler, 1886)
 Heliocheilus paradoxus Grote, 1865
 Heliocheilus puncticulata (Warren, 1913)
 Heliocheilus ranalaetensis Matthews, 1999
 Heliocheilus rhodopolia (Turner, 1911)
 Heliocheilus stigmatia (Hampson, 1903)
 Heliocheilus thelycritus Matthews, 1999
 Heliocheilus thomalae (Gaede, 1915)
 Heliocheilus toralis (Grote, 1881)
 Heliocheilus turbata (Walker, 1858)
 Heliocheilus vulpinotatus Matthews, 1999

References
 Heliocheilus at funet.fi
 Natural History Museum Lepidoptera genus database

 
Heliothinae
Noctuoidea genera

Taxa named by Augustus Radcliffe Grote
Insects described in 1865